Gramoteino is an urban locality (an urban-type settlement) in Kemerovo Oblast, Russia. Population:

References

Urban-type settlements in Kemerovo Oblast